The Battle of the Leitha River was fought on 15 June 1246 near the banks of the Leitha river between the forces of the King Béla IV of Hungary and Duke Frederick II of Austria. The Hungarian army was routed, but Duke Frederick was killed, ending Austrian claims to the western counties of Hungary. Its exact location is unknown; according to the description delivered by contemporary minnesinger Ulrich von Liechtenstein the battlefield may have been between the towns of Ebenfurth and Neufeld.

After their defeat at the 955 Battle of Lechfeld, the Magyars had discontinued their attacks on Germany and settled in the former Roman province of Pannonia, where they established the Kingdom of Hungary. The adjacent territories west of the Leitha were incorporated as the March of Styria into the Holy Roman Empire. In 1180 Emperor Frederick Barbarossa raised the Styrian lands to a duchy, which in 1192 was acquired by the Austrian dukes from the House of Babenberg.

Since 1241 the Hungarian kingdom suffered heavy losses in the course of the Mongol invasion of Europe, culminating in the disastrous Battle of Mohi. The Babenberg duke Frederick II, haughty and overambitious, made use of this weakness, attacked Hungary and claimed the western comitati of Moson, Sopron and Vas. The Hungarian King Bela IV Árpád however was able to make a stand against the Austrian invasion: Supported by the liensmen of his son-in-law Prince Rostislav Mikhailovich he gathered his troops and marched against Frederick's forces, which were challenged at the Leitha and the Duke himself was killed on the battlefield. 

The battle marked the end of the ruling House of Babenberg and sparked another conflict, for the rule over the ceased Imperial fiefs of Austria and Styria between Árpád Hungary and the Bohemian king Ottokar II, leading to the Battle of Kressenbrunn in 1260 and the Battle on the Marchfeld in 1278. The Leitha river remained the borderline between Austria and Hungary (Cis- and Transleithania) until 1918.

Citations

Bibliography

Heide Dienst: Die Schlacht an der Leitha 1246 (= Militärhistorische Schriftenreihe, Vol. 19). Österreichischer Bundesverlag, Vienna 1971,  

the Leitha River
13th century in Austria
the Leitha River
1246 in Europe
the Leitha River
Battles involving Hungary